The Hope Township School District is a comprehensive community public school district that serves students in pre-kindergarten through eighth grade from Hope Township, in Warren County, New Jersey, United States.

As of the 2020–21 school year, the district, comprised of one school, had an enrollment of 115 students and 16.2 classroom teachers (on an FTE basis), for a student–teacher ratio of 7.1:1. In the 2016-17 school year, the district was tied for the 30th-smallest enrollment of any school district in the state.

The district is classified by the New Jersey Department of Education as being in District Factor Group "FG", the fourth-highest of eight groupings. District Factor Groups organize districts statewide to allow comparison by common socioeconomic characteristics of the local districts. From lowest socioeconomic status to highest, the categories are A, B, CD, DE, FG, GH, I and J.

Public school students in ninth through twelfth grades attend Belvidere High School, together with students from Harmony Township Belvidere, New Jersey and White Township, as part of sending/receiving relationships with the Belvidere School District. As of the 2020–21 school year, the high school had an enrollment of 367 students and 32.3 classroom teachers (on an FTE basis), for a student–teacher ratio of 11.4:1.

Schools
Schools in the district (with 2020–21 enrollment data from the National Center for Education Statistics) are:
Hope Township School, with 115 students in grades pre-kindergarten to 8
Kevin Newman, Principal

Administration
Core members of the districts' administration are:
Kevin Newman, Chief School Administrator
Andrew Italiano, Business Administrator / Board Secretary

Board of education
The district's board of education is comprised of seven members who set policy and oversee the fiscal and educational operation of the district through its administration. As a Type II school district, the board's trustees are elected directly by voters to serve three-year terms of office on a staggered basis, with either two or three seats up for election each year held (since 2012) as part of the November general election. The board appoints a superintendent to oversee the day-to-day operation of the district.

References

External links
Hope Township School

Data for Hope Township School, National Center for Education Statistics
Belvidere High School

Hope Township, New Jersey
New Jersey District Factor Group FG
School districts in Warren County, New Jersey
Public K–8 schools in New Jersey